Voldemar Väli (10 January 1903 – 13 April 1997) was an Estonian two-time Olympic medalist  in Greco-Roman wrestling.

Career
Voldemar Väli was born in Kuressaare, on the island of Saaremaa. He began training in wrestling at age 17, and four years later competed at the 1924 Olympics, but was eliminated in a preliminary bout. In 1926 he won his first European title and established himself as a world top featherweight and later lightweight wrestler. He missed the 1932 Olympics because Estonia did not send a team due to the Great Depression, and finished out of the podium at the 1933, 1934, 1937 and 1938 European Championships; however, he earned a bronze at the 1936 Summer Olympics in Berlin. Domestically he won 19 titles between 1922 and 1942 in Greco-Roman and freestyle events. During World War II in 1944 he emigrated with family to Sweden. He ended his sporting career in 1945 after a match between the local Estonians and the team from Stockholm. He beat the Swedish champion Einar Karlsson.

Väli worked a crane operator at the Port of Tallinn. In Sweden, he was a metal worker and later established a doll factory with his wife.

References

External links

GBR Athletics
Eurolympic.org: The European Olympic Committee
Olympics History: CBS SportsLine.com

1903 births
1997 deaths
Sportspeople from Kuressaare
People from the Governorate of Livonia
Wrestlers at the 1924 Summer Olympics
Wrestlers at the 1928 Summer Olympics
Wrestlers at the 1936 Summer Olympics
Estonian male sport wrestlers
Olympic wrestlers of Estonia
Olympic gold medalists for Estonia
Olympic bronze medalists for Estonia
Olympic medalists in wrestling
Medalists at the 1928 Summer Olympics
Medalists at the 1936 Summer Olympics
Estonian World War II refugees
Estonian emigrants to Sweden
European Wrestling Championships medalists